Nils Nilsson Skaar (March 28, 1852 – June 12, 1948) was a Norwegian teacher, farmer, editor, and parliamentary representative from the Fykse Sound in the municipality of Kvam in Hordaland county.

Family
Skaar was born at the Botnen farm at the head of the Fykse Sound in Vikør (now Kvam), the son of Nils Nilsson Skaar (1826–1909), also a mayor and parliamentary representative, and Blansa Nilsdotter Rykkje (1826–1908). His uncle Johannes Skaar (1828–1904) was a Norwegian bishop and hymnologist.

Career
Skaar served as mayor for 20 years and had a permanent seat in the Storting for a total of 15 years (for Søndre Bergenhus from 1886 to 1894, and for Hardanger from 1910 to 1915), and he also participated in another two sessions. He was a member of the Liberal Party. In the Storting he served on the budget and constitution committees, among other positions. He also operated the newspaper Hordaland Folkeblad. Skaar was a county auditor from 1898 to 1910, and he attended the coronation of King Haakon VII and his wife Queen Maud in Trondheim in 1906.

References

19th-century Norwegian politicians
20th-century Norwegian politicians
Liberal Party (Norway) politicians
Hordaland politicians
Members of the Storting
Norwegian newspaper editors
People from Kvam
1852 births
1948 deaths